The Department of Health (DoH,  (IPA:[ˈanˠˈɾˠiːn̪ʲˈsˠlaːnʲtʲə]), Ulster-Scots: Männystrie o Poustie) is a devolved Northern Irish government department in the Northern Ireland Executive.  The minister with overall responsibility for the department is the Minister of Health.

Until 9 May 2016, the department was previously called the Department of Health, Social Services and Public Safety.

Aim
DoH's overall aim and mission is to "improve the health and social well-being of the people of Northern Ireland."

The department launched a new digital strategy in August 2022. It includes the Encompass programme which will create a unified health and care record for the province.

Responsibilities 
The Minister, assisted by the department, makes policy and legislation in three broad areas:
 health and social care – hospitals, family practitioner services and community health and personal social services;
 public health – promoting and protecting the health and well-being of the population; and
 public safety – the Northern Ireland Fire and Rescue Service (commonly known by its former name, the Northern Ireland Fire Brigade) but not the Police Service of Northern Ireland or HM Coastguard.

Some sensitive health policy issues are reserved to Westminster and are therefore not devolved:
 human fertilisation and embryology
 human genetics
 surrogacy
 xenotransplantation

In Northern Ireland, abortion law is a criminal justice matter and is devolved.

DoH's main counterparts in the United Kingdom Government are:
 the Department of Health;
 the Department for Communities and Local Government (on fire services).

In the Irish Government, its main counterparts are:
 the Department of Health;
 the Department of Housing, Local Government and Heritage (on fire services).

Health and Social Care organisations
The Health and Social Care system in Northern Ireland consists of the following public bodies:

Northern Ireland-wide

Health and Social Care Board
Northern Ireland Ambulance Service Health and Social Care Trust
Northern Ireland Blood Transfusion Service
Business Services Organisation
Northern Ireland Fire and Rescue Service
Public Health Agency
Regulation and Quality Improvement Authority

Sub-regional health and social care trusts

Belfast Health and Social Care Trust
Northern Health and Social Care Trust
South Eastern Health and Social Care Trust
Southern Health and Social Care Trust
Western Health and Social Care Trust

History

Health policy in Northern Ireland was originally a responsibility of local government and the Ministry of Home Affairs, which (similarly to the Home Office) retained responsibility for policy areas not delegated to other ministries.

A separate Ministry of Health and Local Government was established in June 1944, as part of the welfare state.  In January 1965, that department was divided between the Ministry of Development and the Ministry of Health and Social Services.

The latter ministry was renamed as the Department of Health and Social Services under direct rule, introduced in March 1972.  A health and social services ministry was also included in the Northern Ireland Executive briefly established in 1974.  The department was responsible for social security policy and its initials DHSS are still used locally to describe benefits and benefit claimants.

Following a referendum on the Belfast Agreement on 23 May 1998 and the granting of royal assent to the Northern Ireland Act 1998 on 19 November 1998, a Northern Ireland Assembly and Northern Ireland Executive were established by the United Kingdom Government under Prime Minister Tony Blair.

In December 1999, the Department of Health and Social Services was renamed as the Department of Health, Social Services and Public Safety. It gained responsibility for the Northern Ireland Fire Brigade from the Department of the Environment but ceded social security to the Department for Social Development.  DHSSPS was therefore one of the six direct rule Northern Ireland departments to continue in existence following devolution, following the Northern Ireland Act 1998 and The Departments (Northern Ireland) Order 1999.

A devolved minister took office on 2 December 1999.  Devolution was suspended for four periods, during which the department came under the responsibility of direct rule ministers from the Northern Ireland Office:
 between 12 February 2000 and 30 May 2000;
 on 11 August 2001;
 on 22 September 2001;
 between 15 October 2002 and 8 May 2007.

Since 8 May 2007, devolution has operated without interruption.

Ministers of Health

Direct rule ministers
During the periods of suspension, the following ministers of the Northern Ireland Office were responsible for the department:

George Howarth (2000)
Des Browne (2002–03)
Angela Smith (2003–05)
Shaun Woodward (2005–06)
Paul Goggins (2006–07)

See also 
 Committee for Health, Social Services and Public Safety
 Disability in Northern Ireland

References

External links
 
  

Northern Ireland Executive
Health in Northern Ireland
Northern Ireland
Northern Ireland
Northern Ireland
Ministries established in 1999
1999 establishments in Northern Ireland